Ulysses is one form of the Roman name for Odysseus, a hero in ancient Greek literature.

Ulysses may also refer to:

People
 Ulysses (given name), including a list of people with this name

Places in the United States
 Ulysses, Kansas
 Ulysses, Kentucky
 Ulysses, Nebraska
 Ulysses Township, Butler County, Nebraska
 Ulysses, New York
Ulysses, Pennsylvania
 Ulysses Township, Potter County, Pennsylvania

Arts and entertainment

Literature 
 "Ulysses" (poem), by Alfred Lord Tennyson
 Ulysses (play), a 1705 play by Nicholas Rowe
 Ulysses, a 1902 play by Stephen Phillips
 Ulysses (novel), by James Joyce
 HMS Ulysses (novel), by Alistair Maclean
 Ulysses (comics), two members of a fictional group in the Marvel Comics universe
 Ulysses Klaue, a character in Marvel comic books
 Ulysses: Jeanne d'Arc and the Alchemist Knight, a light novel

Film and television 
 Ulysses (1954 film), starring Kirk Douglas based on the story of Homer's Odyssey
 Ulysses (1967 film), based on Joyce's novel
 Ulysses (2011 film), a 2011 Chilean film
 Ulysses (broadcast), a dramatised radio broadcast of Joyce's novel
 Ulysses 31, a French-Japanese anime television program
 Ulixes, a fictional spacecraft in the 4th season of  Teenage Mutant Ninja Turtles

Music 
 Ulysse (Rebel), a 1703 French opera by Jean-Fery Rebel
 Ulisse (1960–68), an Italian opera by Luigi Dallapiccola
 Ulysses, an English-language cantata by Mátyás Seiber
Ulysses (band) a German progressive rock band
 Ulysses (band), an American band
 Ulysses (EP), by Shimamiya Eiko
 "Ulysses" (song), by Franz Ferdinand
 "Ullyses", a song by Dead Can Dance from the album The Serpent's Egg

Video games 
 Ulysses 1994XF04, a fictional asteroid in the video game Ace Combat
 Ulysses, an assumed name of the antagonist of the Fallout: New Vegas expansion Lonesome Road

Science and technology

 ULYSSES (cable system), a submarine communications cable network
 Ulysses (robot), a bomb-detecting robot
 Ulysses (spacecraft), a space probe designed to study the Sun
 Ulysses (text editor), a software product for creative writing
 Ulysses butterfly (Papilio ulysses) a butterfly endemic to Australasia
 5254 Ulysses, an asteroid
 Typhoon Dolphin (2008), a 2008 Pacific Typhoon known as Ulysses in the Philippines
 Typhoon Vamco, a 2020 Pacific Typhoon known as Ulysses in the Philippines

Sport
Ulisses FC, a defunct Armenian football club
Ulysses F.C., a former English football club

Vehicles

Maritime
 , a 116-meter expedition yacht
 , four ships of the British Royal Navy
 , any of several ships
 , any of several ships
 SS Ulysses (1914), a World War I-era steel-hulled screw steamer
 , any of several ships of the U.S. Navy
 USS Ulysses (ARB-9), a battle damage repair ship of the U.S. Navy

Other vehicles
 Ulysses (spacecraft), a space probe designed to study the Sun
 Ulysses, manufactured by the Buell Motorcycle Company
 Ulysses (later Grierson), a GWR 3031 Class locomotive on the Great Western Railway between 1891 and 1915

Other uses
 Ulysses Club, an international motorcycling club
 Ulysses (horse) (born 2013), a thoroughbred racehorse

See also
 
 
 Odysseus (disambiguation), the Greek form of this name